Salah El-Din Ahmed Mourad Zulfikar (18 January 1926 – 22 December 1993) was an Egyptian actor and film producer. He started his career as a police officer in the Egyptian National Police, before becoming an actor in 1956. He is regarded as one of the most influential actors in the history of Egyptian film industry. Zulfikar had roles in more than hundred feature films in multiple genres during a 37-year career, mostly as the leading actor, he was one of the most dominant leading men in the Egyptian cinema. He also worked in theater throughout his career, playing celebrated theatrical roles. Late in his career, Zulfikar had considerable success in television roles. In 1996, in the centenary of Egyptian cinema, ten of his films as an actor and five of his films as a producer were listed in the Top hundred Egyptian films of the 20th century.

Salah Zulfikar was one of Egypt's heroes in its battle against the occupation while serving in the police. His son, Egyptian entrepreneur Ahmed Zulfikar, mentioned in a 1994 press release that his father participated in the guerrilla war in Ismailia against the British in 1944, and his patriotism was without limits. Afterwards, Zulfikar volunteered in the Battle of Ismailia of 1952, and in the 1956 Suez War. He was awarded the medal of military duty (first class) from Egyptian President Gamal Abdel Nasser, in appreciation for his efforts in serving his country.

After becoming an actor in 1956 and film producer in 1958. He started his career as a part-time actor with temporary permits from Ministry of Interior. Later, he went on to be a full time actor in late 1957. He appeared in feature films, short films, stage, television and radio serials. Zulfikar is one of the most famous artistic figures in Egypt and the Arab world. His contributions to film, television and stage as an actor and film producer earned him a worldwide reputation that made him one of the most influential middle eastern and Arab public figures in the 20th century.

Early life and education
Salah El-Din Ahmed Mourad Zulfikar was born on January 18, 1926, in El Mahalla El Kubra, Gharbia, to Ahmed Mourad Bey Zulfikar (1888-1945), a senior police commissioner in the Ministry of Interior, and his wife Nabila Zulfikar, a housewife. Zulfikar was the seventh of eight brothers and sisters. His eldest brother, Mohamed, was a businessman, two elder sisters were Soad and Fekreya. Another brother was movie actor and director Mahmoud. His brother Ezz El-Dine was also a movie director, Kamal Zulfikar was a military officer. His younger brother Mamdouh was a businessman.

Zulfikar excelled in his studies and was an athlete. He was one of Egypt's champions in boxing and won the King's Cup in boxing (featherweight) in 1947. He initially joined the Faculty of Medicine, Alexandria University, to please his father, who wished Zulfikar to become a doctor like his grandfather. After his father became sick, he transferred his admission to the Police Academy so he could stay in Cairo beside his father. He graduated in 1946. Salah Zulfikar was appointed to the Menoufia Security Directorate and the Prisons Authority, specifically Egypt Prison, and also worked as a teacher at the Police Academy.

Police career 
While studying in Police Academy, Zulfikar participated in the guerrilla war of Ismailia against the British forces in 1944. Zulfikar graduated in 1947, he was assigned immediately in Monufia Governorate Police force. A year later he was assigned in prison of Cairo which was responsible for prisoners including Anwar Sadat (President of Egypt in 1970) in 1947.  In 1949, Zulfikar started teaching at the Police Academy. In 1952 he volunteered to join the police unit in Ismaïlia which was under attack by the British Army. The Egyptian police force refused to hand over their weapons to the British forces, which led the British army to bring in tanks to capture the building. The ensuing battle of Ismailia was later commemorated and is now celebrated in Egypt on 25 January of every year as National Police Day. Zulfikar received a National Award of Honor for his bravery.

In 1956 Suez war, Zulfikar took the initiative leading 19 of his students in the Police Academy and volunteered as commandos resisting the tripartite attack by the British, French and Israeli armies. Zulfikar also received the Medal of Military Duty (first Class) from President Gamal Abdel Nasser for risking his life for his country with bravery and honor.

Acting career

Early career and first leading role 
Salah Zulfikar's elder brothers Ezz El-Dine Zulfikar and Mahmoud Zulfikar were film directors. During his free time he used to attend film shooting. In 1955, his brother, Ezz El-Dine, tried to convince Zulfikar to start acting but he refused for he thought it is an impossible idea due to the nature of his job as a police officer.

Finally under Ezz El-Dine's persistence, Zulfikar agreed and was granted a temporary permit from the Minister of the Interior, which was headed at the time by Zakaria Mohieddin to take the leading role in Wakeful Eyes (Uyoun Sahrana), released in 1956. His second role was Hussein Abdel Wahed in Back Again (Rodda Qalbi) (1957), Zulfikar was a natural and his performance gained public passion. The next year, he was cast by Youssef Chahine for Jamila, the Algerian (Djamila) (1958). Zulfikar acted in both films with temporary permits.

After Zulfikar's success, he had to choose his career path. He asked the minister for resignation but instead was promoted to lieutenant colonel and granted an early pension for his impressive record.

1950s: Breakthrough 

Zulfikar's second movie after Wakeful Eyes was Ezz El-Dine Zulficar's Back Again (Rodda Qalbi) (1957), it was his first success, the film was telling the story of the Egyptian revolution of 1952 and became a yearly celebration on the Egyptian state television on every 23rd of July. Followed by Youssef Chahine's Jamila, the Algerian (Gameela) (1958), in which he played the role of Azzam.

In 1959, Salah Zulfikar starred in six films including Ezz El-Dine Zulficar's The Second Man (Elragol Elthani), and it earned Zulfikar praise from Cairo critics. Followed by Hassan El Imam's Love and Adoration (Hob hatta El Ebada) alongside Taheyya kariokka. Zulfikar's acting earned favorable reviews.

Zulfikar's following role was in Light of the Night (Nour El Leil) alongside Mariam Fakhr Eddine. He played the lead in Forbidden Women (Nesaa Moharramat) (1959), a box-office hit alongside Huda Sultan. He portrayed the role of Ahmed, a playboy, and the film was full of romantic scenes, showing Zulfikar's potential in romance film genre. In the following film, he co-starred in his production debut; Among the Ruins (Bain Al Atlal), was a classical romance earning both critical and financial success. The commercial success of one film after another made him a bankable star.

1960s: Stardom 

Zulfikar's selection of diversified roles increased his popularity in Egypt and the Middle East. In 1960, he starred in Hassan El-Imam's I accuse (Eni Attahem), a thriller with Zulfikar sharing the lead with Zubaida Tharwat and Emad Hamdy, he portrayed the role of Salah the journalist. He starred in Niazi Mostafa's A Scrap of Bread (Louqmat Al-Aych) (1960) making good numbers in the box-office despite press predictions before the film's release. His next film was The Sacred Bond (Al Rubat Al Muqadas) (1960) alongside Sabah and Emad Hamdy earning him critical recognition from Cairo critics for both his role as an actor and a producer. Zulfikar was paired with Soad Hosny for the first time in Hassan El Imam's Money and Women (Mal Wa Nesaa) (1960), the film was a commercial success which later encouraged both movie stars to make four more films together. In 1961, Zulfikar starred in six films, the romantic comedy; That's What Love Is (El Hubb Keda) alongside Sabah was a great box-office success. Mahmoud Zulfikar's Rendezvous with the Past (Maww'ed Maa El Maady) alongside Mariam Fakhr Eddine was a romantic classic making good numbers in the box-office. Another romance was A Storm of Love (A'sefa Min Al Hubb) (1961) co-starring Nahed Sherif in her first leading role. He played his first villain role in his career, starring in the commercial hit Me and my Daughters (Ana wa Banaty) (1961) alongside leading veteran actor Zaki Rostom supported by Nahed Sherif and Fayza Ahmed. The following years, Salah Zulfikar achieved success throughout the Middle East through multiple film genres. He shared the lead with Mariam Fakhr Eddine in horror box-office hit The Cursed Palace (Al-Qasr Al-Mal'oun) (1962). His next role was Mahmoud, playing the lead in The Comic Society for Killing Wives (Gama'eyat Qatl al-Zawgat al-Hazleya) (1962), a comedy with a supporting cast including Zahrat El-Ola, Hussein Riad, Marie Mounib, Zeinat Sedki, among others. The film achieved good numbers in the box-office. He was paired with Soad Hosny for the second time in Ezz El-Dine Zulficar's Appointment at the Tower (Maww'ed Fil-borg) (1962), the film was a box-office hit.

In 1963, his role as Issa El Awam in Saladin the Victorious (El Nasser Saladin) by Youssef Shahine was praised. The same year, he played Doctor Hamooda in Mahmoud Zulfikar's Soft hands (El Aydy el Naema) (1963) with his performance earning him state's award for best actor in a leading role. The film was a participant in 14th Berlin International Film Festival in 1964. Zulfikar starred in A Husband on Vacation (Zogue fe Agaza), a romantic comedy in which he played the character of Essam Nour Eddine who became bored from his marriage life. The film was a commercial hit and provided Laila Taher her first ever leading role. In Italy, Zulfikar played a role of an Egyptian police officer in the Italian film; Secret of the Sphinx (La sfinge sorride prima di morire - Stop Londra) (1964) directed by Duccio Tessari. After the film's release, Tessari asked Zulfikar to settle in Italy to earn better opportunities in Italian cinema but he refused and preferred to stay in Egypt. On stage, Zulfikar's debut was the 1964's A Bullet in the Heart (Rosasa Fil Qalb) alongside Laila Taher, it was based on Tawfiq Al-Hakim's novel under the same name. The play was shown for a whole year in Cairo theaters. The romantic drama; Dearer than my Life (Aghla Min Hayati) (1965) was successful and his performance is regarded as one of Zulfikar's greatest. It earned him state award for best actor in a leading role. In the following years, the film turned out to be a romantic classic and the two main characters of Ahmed and Mona became a symbol of love and affection among Egyptians.

The Fatin Abdel Wahab's romantic comedy trilogy; My Wife, the Director General (Mirati Moudir Aam) (1966). Followed by My Wife's Dignity (Karamet Zawgati) (1967), earning him state's award for best actor in a leading role for his performance. And My Wife's Goblin (Afreet Mirati) (1968), all three films alongside Shadia were financial and critical successes. In 1967, Zulfikar starred in the political play; Rubabikia (Robabeekya) (1967) alongside Taheyya Kariokka and Nabila Ebeid achieving critical and financial success. In 1968, Zulfikar shared the lead with Magda and Kamal El-Shennawi in Kamal El Sheikh's The Man Who Lost His Shadow (El Ragol El-lazi fakad Zilloh), the film earned critical recognition. In the next year, he starred in the comedy; Good Morning, My Dear Wife (Sabah El Kher ya Zawgaty El Azeeza) (1969). The film was a commercial hit in theaters in Egypt and the Arab world. This encouraged Zulfikar to give an opportunities to a new generation of actresses co-starring in his next films, such as Nelly, Mervat Amin and Naglaa Fathy.

1970s: Bankable star 

Exceeding a decade as a bankable star in Egypt and the Arab world, in the 1970s, Zulfikar was focused on commercial success. He starred in My Husband's Wife (Imra'at Zawgy) (1970), a box-office hit alongside leading actresses; Nelly and Naglaa Fathi. In the same year, he earned critical recognition from Cairo critics for his performance as Amin Akef in the political thriller, of Kamal El Sheikh's Sunset and Sunrise (Ghroob wa Shrooq) (1970). His next role was Fahmy in Virgo (Borj El-Athraa) (1970) with Zulfikar in the lead alongside Nahed Sherif, Adel Emam and Lebleba in the supporting roles. In the same year, he starred in the thriller; Eye of Life (Ain El Hayah) (1970), achieved good numbers in the box office. In 1971, he starred in the crime thriller; The Killers (El Qatala) by Ashraf Fahmy, a box office success in Egypt, he was paired with Faten Hamama in Henry Barakat's short film Witch (Sahira) (1971).

In his six films of 1972, Zulfikar played diversified roles including Mohsen in A Call for Life (Da'wa Lil Hayah) (1972), co-starring Mervat Amin and Mahmoud El-Meliguy. In Lebanon, he was paired with Sabah for the sixth and last time in Paris and Love (Paris wal Hob) (1972), and the film was a commercial hit, the highest-grossing film in Lebanese theatres of the year, however it was received with mixed reviews by critics. He starred in Mahmoud Zulfikar's Featureless Men (Regal bila Malameh) (1972) alongside actress Nadia Lutfi, the film was shot in 1970, released two years later and made good numbers in the box-office. Zulfikar partnered with Soad Hosny for the fourth time in Those People of the Nile (Al Nass Wal Nil) (1972) directed by Youssef Chahine. On stage, Zulfikar played the role of a bachelor in the successful comedy; A Bachelor and Three Maidens (Azib Wa Talaat Awanes) (1972). In Syria, Zulfikar played the lead in the Syrian romance Memory of A Night of Love (Zekra Lailat Hubb) (1973) alongside leading actresses Nelly, Nabila Ebeid, Muna Wassef, and Hala Shawkat, was successful in Syrian and Lebanese theaters. Zulfikar achieved box-office success in Egyptian theaters in his psychological drama The Other Man (Al Rajul Al Akhar) (1973) in which he was also the executive producer.

In Mexico, Zulfikar played the role of his fellow Egyptian King Horemheb alongside Geraldine Chaplin in the short film Nefertiti and Akhenaton (Spanish: Nefertiti y Aquentos) (1973) directed by Raúl Araiza. In 1974, Zulfikar starred in four films, he played a character of a man suffering from insomnia in 2-1-0 (Etnein Wahed Sefr) (1974). Followed by Dr. Nabil, the psychiatrist treating a bunch of young men with serious issues by taking them on a summer trip to start treatment in In Summer We Must Love (Fel Saef Lazem Neheb) (1974), a comedy co-starring Nour El-Sherif, Samir Ghanem, Magda El Khatib, Abdel Moneim Madbouly, Lebleba and Madiha Kamel. In the same year, he starred in Dunya (1974), a drama co-starring Nelly, Mahmoud El-Meliguy and Saeed Saleh.

In theater, Zulfikar starred in Three Cards Hotel (Fondo' El Talaat Wara't) (1974), a comedy co-starring Samir Ghanem and George Sidhom. A villain role, was Hafez in The Guilty (Al Mothneboon) (1976). Passing a year from films, in 1977, Zulfikar starred in three television series: The Truth..That Unknown (Al Haqeeqa Thalek Al Maghool) co-starring Soher Al Bably, and Those Who Burn (Alatheen Yahtareqoon), both aired on Arabian television channels earning success throughout the Arab world. Followed by the famous TV miniseries; The Return of the Spirit (Awdet El Roh), aired in 1977 on Egyptian and Arab television networks, was based on Tawfiq Al-Hakim's 1933 novel under the same name, the miniseries was popular in Egypt and the Arab world, it is considered one of Zulfikar's most successful television works of his career.

Back to films in the following year, Zulfikar played the leading character of a police detective investigating a homicide in the crime thriller Desire and Price (Al Raghba Wal Thaman) (1978) a crime thriller alongside Shoukry Sarhan and Nahed Sherief. In the same year, he starred in the commercial hit; Roadless Traveller (Mosafer bila Tareeq) (1978) directed by Ali Abdel Khalek and despite the rich cast that included Mahmoud Yassin, Magda El Khatib, Mahmoud El-Meliguy, Gamil Ratib, Afaf Shoueib and Mohsen Sarhan, the film received low critical reviews. And in an unexpected role, Zulfikar played the role of Sarout, an angel who comes to Earth to try to save his fellow angel in Sin of An Angel (Khati'at Malak) (1979). On stage, he starred in One Wife is Enough (Zawga Waheda Takfi) (1979) co-starring Mohamed Negm and the play was a commercial success with low critical reviews. In 1979, he played the lead of the thriller police mystery Detective Inspector (Mofattesh El Mabaheth) alongside Laila Taher, he played the lead in his original job as a police officer, the role of Major General Mohie, a high-ranking police detective, and the series was aired in Egypt and throughout the Arab world.

1980s: Another career peak 
Zulfikar's films, television films and series continued to be successful during the eighties. Due to major alteration in Egyptian cinema in the 1980s, Zulfikar focused generally on television becoming selective in his film roles. In 1980, he starred in the mystery series: Illusion and Truth (Al-Wahm W Al-Haqeeqa) playing the role of Gaafar Abel Geleel earning high ratings. He starred in the 1981 film; I'm Not Lying But I'm Beautifying (Ana La Aktheb Wlakenani Atajaml) sharing the lead as Rafik Hamdy, a famous writer and a father for the first time, a social drama alongside Ahmed Zaki, Athar El-Hakim, and Zahrat El-Ola. Followed by the dramatic film; Secret Visit (Zeyara Serreya) (1981), in which Zulfikar portrayed Judge Ismail, earning him the state's award for best actor in a leading role. His next role was Abdel Ghaffar Lotfy, playing the lead in; A Moment of Weakness (Lahzet Da'af) (1981), alongside Hussein Fahmy and Nelly. Zulfikar portrayed a complex character and his performance was glowingly reviewed by critics and the film made good numbers in the box-office.

In 1982, Zulfikar shared the lead with Nour El-Sherif in the crime thriller; The Peacock (El Tawoos) of Kamal El Sheikh, and it garnered critical and financial success, earning him the state's award for best actor in a leading role for his performance and for the second time in a raw. After his two consecutive awards, Zulfikar turned down many scripts and spent 1982 to 1985 away from films.

He played the lead in six television series including the 1982 thriller police mystery Dalia the Egyptian (Dalia El-Masreya) alongside Madiha Salem, Hassan Youssef, he played the lead as the director of the Egyptian intelligence service, the series was aired in Egypt and throughout the Arab world. In the same year, he played the lead in the drama Torment Journey (Rihlat Azab), the series was aired in Egypt and achieved high ratings. In 1983, he starred in the television miniseries; Flowers and Cactus (Zohoor W Ashwak) alongside Zahrat El-Ola, it gained high critical reviews but was aired only in Arab channels and was not aired in Egypt. In theatre, he starred in Hanan My Wife (Merati Hanan) (1984) achieving commercial and critical success. In 1984, he played the lead in the biggest joint Arab production of Arab television at the time; The Mirror (Al Miraya) television series making Salah Zulfikar the highest-paid actor in the Middle East, the historical drama miniseries featured a pan-Arab cast that included Hind Kamel, Samiha Ayoub, among others, and was aired on Arab television networks and was not aired in Egypt. Polific on stage as well and starring in five plays on Cairo theaters such as Possible? Not Possible (Ma'oul? La Ma'oul) (1985), sharing the lead with Huda Sultan earning both critical and financial success.

Zulfikar returned to films in 1985 upon Youssef Chahine's insisting request, on his fifth venture with Chahine, he played the role of the blind Cheikh Hassouna in Adieu Bonaparte (Wadaan bounapart) and the film was recognised by French critics in Cannes Film Festival. The next year, he starred in Please and Your Kindness (Min Fadlik Wa Ihsanik) (1986), a successful adaptation of Naguib Mahfouz's novel, with a supporting cast including Huda Sultan and Hesham Selim. His next role was Fadel Abu Al-Fadl; the wealthy man who spent almost everything he owned to build a huge villa and own a sports car in the comedy film; The Barefoot Millionaire (El Millionaira El Hafya) (1987), co-starring Hala Fouad, followed by the 1987 television series; Diplomatic Love (Al Hubb Fe Haqeeba Diplomacia), which was aired only on Arab television channels, supported by leading actors Laila Fawzi, Ahmed Mazhar, Mariam Fakhr Eddine, among others was well received by the Arab audience but was never aired on Egyptian television. In 1987, Zulfikar played the role of Judge Abdel Hamid in Escape to Prison (El Horoob Ela El-Sign) (1987), co-starring Ahmed Marei and Elham Shahin achieving good ratings among the Egyptian audience.

1988 was a prosperous year in Zulfikar's cinematic career. He starred in four films and two TV movies including, Sorry for Bothering (Asef Lel Ezaag) (1988) written by Anis Mansour. A social drama film co-starring Raghda, and Love Also Dies (Al Hubb Aydan Yamoot) (1988), a romantic film featuring Safia El Emari and Ezzat El Alaili.
Zulfikar's starred in the popular socio-drama; Monsieur le Directeur (Elosta El-Moudir) (1988) with a supporting cast that includes Laila Taher, Mustafa Metwalli, among others. The film was popular with both audiences and critics. He shared the lead in Said Marzouk's commercial hit Days of Terror (Ayam El Ro'b) of 1988 playing the role of El Hag Abdel Raheem, the religious rich seller living in Al Hussein neighborhood, a crime thriller alongside Mervat Amin and Mahmoud Yassin. 1989 was a productive year for Salah Zulfikar with three films and two TV movies including the comedy; Mr. Aliwa's Apartment (Sha'et El Ostaz Aliwa) (1989) co-starring Laila Taher, and three television series such as the popular episodes of The Years' Reckoning (Hesaab El-Seneen), aired in Arab television.

1990s: TV massive success 
Zulfikar's career was revitalized by his cheerful, good-natured performance in The Family of Mr Shalash (A'elat El Ostath Chalash) miniseries of 1990, it was an Egyptian and pan-Arab success, the series which later became one of Egypt's television classics, is considered one of Zulfikar's most successful television works of his career. His final theatre role was in The Earthquake (El Zelzal) (1990), a drama based on Mustafa Mahmoud's book with the same name achieving critical and financial success.

Back to box-office in 1991, Zulfikar starred in the crime thriller Wicked Game (Lu'bat Al Ashrar) (1991) by Henry Barakat, the film was a commercial success with mixed critical reviews. He starred in the TV movies; Anything but my Daughter (Ela Ibnaty) (1992) written by Ihsan Abdel Quddus, and Minister in Plaster (Wazir fel Gebs) based on Fathy Ghanem's story in 1993, and both films earned him critical praise. His next and final villain role was El Hag Abdel Rahim, the drug dealer in the commercial hit; Flames of Vengeance (Laheeb Al-Intiqam), an action thriller alongside Nour El-Sherif and Lebleba.

Final roles 
In television, Zulfikar's final role was the lead in The Final Return (El-Awda El-Akhira), aired on Egyptian television for the first time in 1993. In the same year, he acted in Road to Eilat, Nader Galal's The Terrorist and Ashraf Fahmy's Five-Star Thieves. These were Zulfikar's final cinematic roles. He appeared in a special appearance as Admiral Fouad Mohamed Abou Zikry, the Commander-in-chief of the Egyptian Navy in the war drama Road to Eilat (El Tareek ela Eilat). He played the role of Dr. Abdelmoneim the head of the family which the terrorist decided to hide in his house in The Terrorist (El Irhabi) which he couldn't continue filming. Zulfikar played the lead in Five-Star Thieves (Losoos Khamas Nogoom) as Galal Suleiman, an honest bank director dealing with a major fraud. All three films were released posthumously in 1994.

Film production career

1958-1962: Ezz El-Dine Zulficar Films 
In 1958, Salah Zulfikar and his brother Ezz El-Dine Zulficar established a film production corporation under the trade name of Ezz El-Dine Zulficar Films. He took over the administrative side. Zulfikar's film production career prompted him to resign from his post as the executive director of the Afro-Asian People's Solidarity Organisation in 1962.

The Zulfikar brothers produced their first film; Among the Ruins (Bain Al Atlal) (1959) in which his portrayal of Ahmed earned praise from critics. The film was directed by Ezz El-Dine Zulficar and was commercially and critically successful, and was listed later in the Top 100 Egyptian films. Zulfikar co-produced and starred in the box office hit; The Second Man (Al Ragol Al Thani) (1959) of Ezz El-Dine Zulficar, featuring Salah Zulfikar in two roles alongside Rushdy Abaza, Samia Gamal and Sabah. In 1960, they produced Angel and Devil (Malak W Sheitan) starring Rushdy Abaza and directed by Kamal El Sheikh. The film was another breakthrough to Rushdy Abaza after his success in The Second Man. Followed by The Holy Bond (Al Rabat Al Moqaddas) (1960) starring Sabah, Salah Zulfikar, Emad Hamdy, and directed by his older brother Mahmoud Zulfikar, the film later became an Egyptian cinematic classic. Their next venture was Tewfik Saleh's Struggle of the Heroes (1962) (Sir'a Al-Abtal), which was later listed in the Top 100 Egyptian films.

1962-1975: Salah Zulfikar Films 
In 1962, Zulfikar established Salah Zulfikar Films, his own corporation, to produce feature films. Their goal was to focus on film sales, but as the founder stated in a 1969 television interview, aired on Channel 1 of the Egyptian television 

Salah Zulfikar Films produced three films in the first year of operations. The newly born company's first venture was Ezz El-Dine Zulficar's Appointment at the Tower (Maww'ed Fil-Borg) (1962) including Salah Zulfikar and Soad Hosny and Fouad El-Mohandes in the leading roles. His next venture was Niazi Mostafa's I am the fugitive (Ana El Hareb) (1962) starring Farid Shawqi, followed by Letter from an Unknown Woman (Resala min Imra'a Maghoola) (1962) of Salah Abu Seif, starring Lobna Abdel Aziz and Farid Al-Atrash. All of which achieved box office success. Four years later, Salah Zulfikar Films produced his box office hit; My Wife, the Director General (Mirati Modeer Aam) (1966) directed by Fatin Abdel Wahab. It film did justice to the main female character and allowed her to be a director over men. The film was a commercial and critical success for Zulfikar as an actor and producer, and turned out to be a cinematic classic. Zulfikar won the Egypt's best film producer award for 1966. The film won the best film award from the Egyptian Catholic Center for Cinema, and was later listed in the Top 100 Egyptian films. Another 1966 box-office hit was Zulfikar's Three Thieves or (3 Losoos), the film tells three separate stories of three thieves waiting for a ruling from the judge, a role that was played by Yehia Chahine. Each story is describing the reasons why every character turned out to be a thief. And the three stories were written by Ihsan Abdel Quddous, and directed by three different filmmakers; "The gold Thief" (Sareq Al Dahab) by Fatin Abdel Wahab, "The bus thief" (Sareq Al-Autobus) by Hassan El-Imam, and "His aunt’s thief" (Sareq Ameto) by Kamal El Sheikh. Zulfikar starred in a "The gold Thief" alongside Hind Rostom.

In 1969, Salah Zulfikar Films produced A Taste of Fear (Shey min El Khouf) starring Shadia and directed by Hussein Kamal, and it caused an uproar in Egypt at the time. The film was banned at first. But when Zulfikar took the film and watched it with the President Gamal Abdel Nasser, who watched the film for another time, he finally allowed its release in theatres. The award-winning film achieved financial and critical success in Egypt and the Middle East and was later listed in the Top 100 Egyptian films. In Lebanon, Zulfikar produced A Journey of Suffering (Rihlat Azab) (1972), a stylized horror melodrama directed by Lebanese film director Reda Meissar. Cast included Nahed Sherif, Tawfik El-Deken, and actors from Egypt, Syria and Lebanon. The film was mostly released in Syrian and Lebanese theaters, but was released as well in Egypt, and made financially good numbers. In 1973, he was the executive producer of a short film named The Death Song (Oghneyat El Moot) starring Faten Hamama and directed by Henry Barakat. The film discussed the issue of revenge in Upper Egypt and its consequences on the Egyptian people. 

Zulfikar worked as executive producer for The Other Man (Al Rajul Al Akhar) (1973), in which he also took the leading role. With an ensemble cast that includes Shams El-Baroudi, Zubaida Tharwat, Kamal El-Shennawi, and Emad Hamdy, the film was financially successful. Salah Zulfikar Films produced I Want A Solution (Oreed hallan) (1975) starring Faten Hamama and co-starring Rushdy Abaza. It was discussing the women's rights in divorce. The film achieved box office and critical success and contributed in changing the personal status law in Egypt at the time in favor of women. It was Zulfikar's last film production and he won the state award for best producer for the second time, and later, this film was listed in the Top 100 films in the centenary of Egyptian cinema.

Death 
Salah Zulfikar died of a sudden heart attack on Wednesday, 22 December 1993, at the Police Hospital in Cairo, Egypt.

Honours

Acting style 
In 1965, Dearer than My Life critical reviews, Galil El-Bandary, wrote, "I could not have imagined that Salah Zulfikar could make me cry and make tears pour out of my eyes like hot water! Convincing, and he had found his role, which he kept dreaming of and happened!". Another 1965 Egyptian film critic reviewed in Al-Ghad newspaper on Dearer than My Life: "Salah Zulfikar played a character of a man in three different age stages in a smooth manner." In 1976, in Al Kuwait newspaper critical review: "He assured everyone that he’s a camouflage actor who can play any kind of role." On his performance in I'm Not Lying But I'm Beautifying (1981), prominent film writer and critic Amir El-Amry reviewed: "Salah Zulfikar’s performance in the film reflects his experience, confidence, extreme spontaneity, and ability to persuade, he's real, perfectly natural."

Mahmoud Qassem wrote; "Salah Zulfikar explained the character running between lightness and movement through a very simple and attractive performance.", a 1999 critical review on Zulfikar's role in The Second Man (1959). "A cool guy who hides behind his humor a great deal of seriousness, courage, and optimism, whether in life or death." 2009 Khaleej magazine critical review on Zulfikar's performance in Jamila, the Algerian (1958). In 1975, Tharwat Abaza reviewed: "I cannot miss to congratulate Salah Zulfikar, for his top role, as well as a wonderful performance.", on Zulfikar's performance in The Guilty (1975). Film critic Tarek El Shennawi stated: "Salah Zulfikar was able to prove that he is a genius and talented actor, he had multiple roles in drama, comedy and action, all of which he managed to master." interview aired on On E, 19 January 2021. "True talent never die, and the talent of Salah Zulfikar exploded with the most beautiful films, and he remained for the last day of his life working in film.", Ahmed El-Samahi in Al-Ahram. "Zulfikar is significantly remembered for his role as a poor Arabic teacher who gradually introduces Mazhar to reality and responsibility." 2017 Egypt Today's critical review on Zulfikar's performance in Soft Hands (1963).

Awards 
Salah Zulfikar received numerous awards through his thirty seven-year career including his first State Award from the Ministry of Culture for Best Actor in leading role for his performance in Soft Hands (Al Aydy Al Naema) in 1963. He won the State Award for Best Actor in a leading role for his performance in Dearer than my life (Aghla Min Hatati) in 1965. The next year, he won the State Award for Best Producer of the year for My Wife, the Director General (Mirati Moudir Aam) (1966), which also received the Best Film Award from the Catholic Center Film Festival. He won the State Award for Best Actor in a leading role for his performance in My Wife's Dignity (Karamet Zawgati) in 1967. He won State Award for Best Producer of the year for I Want a Solution (Oridu Hallan) in 1975. Zulfikar received an honorary Certificate of Appreciation from President Anwar El-Sadat on Art Day in 1979. In 1981 and after fourteen years from his last state's award as an actor, he won the State Award for Best Actor in a leading role for his performance in Secret Visit (Zeyara Serreya). Next year, he won the state award of Best Actor for his performance in a leading role for his performance in The Peacock (El Tawoos) in 1982 for the second consecutive time. Later, in 1991, he received the Special Jury Award from Cairo International Film Festival. Zulfikar posthumously received the Honorary Award for his life's work from the National Egyptian Film Festival in 1994.

Legacy
Zulfikar's enduring status as an iconic Egyptian was formally recognized by Egypt's government in the form of two of the highest civilian decorations and one military decoration. He was one of Egypt's heroes in its battle against the occupation while serving in the police. Ahmed Zulfikar spoke about his father in a 1994 press release:

He was admired by fellow policemen of his generation and the generations followed (Zulfikar was a professor in Police Academy) for his bravery. His courage as a veteran national hero during his service as a policeman earned him a respectable reputation through the whole militarized spectrum.
In the Cairo Citadel, a big photo of Salah Zulfikar and his colleagues stands in the police museum, in honor of the heroes of the 1952 battle of Ismailia against the British. This battle's day is celebrated as the National police day on 25 January from every year.

Zulfikar was one of the most respected actors of his generation. Cairo cinematic figures admired him for his extreme discipline, his dignity, his integrity, and because of his talents as an actor, his strength as a leader, throughout his illustrious career. This particular rare parallel success in both acting and film production earned him the title of "The Genius". All-time favorite co-star in film, television and on stage, long-time friend, Laila Taher stated in a press release that, "He was a gentleman, he treated everyone who worked with him as if they’re family, God had granted him respect, humility, and shouldering responsibility. He was a bold and courageous man that feared no one. Salah Zulfikar spoke on Egyptian youth in an Egyptian Television interview in 1985:

Salah Zulfikar is a cultural icon with enduring popularity. His rise to national attention in the 1960s had a profound effect on Egyptian culture. His collaborations to social issues earned him prominence throughout the Arab world. Zulfikar was also considered a male sex symbol. Egyptian actress Bushra stated: "Salah Zulfikar [was] my fairy tale "knight of dreams" (A title he owned from the early 1960s)". He appeared opposite many of the most popular actresses of their time. Mariam Fakhreddine was a favorite actress of his to work with, and he partnered with her in thirteen films. He starred with Nelly in seven features. Shadia and Sabah worked with him six times, and he was paired with Soad Hosny in five productions. Nadia Lutfi, Huda Sultan and Mervat Amin worked with him four times. He also starred with each of Magda, Zubaida Tharwat and Hind Rostom in three productions, and he was paired twice with each of Faten Hamama and Naglaa Fathi.

Zulfikar was one of the most consistent box-office performers in Egyptian cinema, remaining a bankable star for over two decades. Hemmat Moustafa wrote in: Salah Zulfikar: A Journey into the life of a genius artist: "Salah Zulfikar, one of the most prominent cinematic artists of the twentieth century, who enriched Egyptian art as an actor and a producer with many masterpieces that made him remain in the memory of both the Egyptian and global cinema, and in the conscience and memory of the masses." Prior venturing into the acting world, he was a professor at the Police Academy. This added to Zulfikar's allure. His dreamy eyes, fit physique and good acting placed Zulfikar way up on the Hot List. Salah Zulfikar has always been a women's rights defender and expressed his belief through his films and has produced more than one film, doing justice for Egyptian women.

In Cairo, there are two streets named in honor of Salah Zulfikar, including one in Abbassia, the neighborhood where he was born, and one in New Cairo. Several celebrations took place in his name and he was awarded posthumously in several artistic events. In February, 2022, Cairo Opera House invited Karim Zulfikar, a businessman, and the youngest grandson of Salah Zulfikar to be the speaker in a seminar titled; "The Zulfikar brothers collaboration to cinematic history", attended by a large crowd celebrating their admiration to the legacy of the influential film star.

Personal life 

Zulfikar was married for four times. He married his first wife, Mrs. Nafisa Bahgat, daughter of Mahmoud Bey Bahgat in 1947, a socialite, and she bore him his son Ahmed and a daughter Mona, and she remained his wife until her death in 1988. His son Ahmed Zulfikar graduated as a mechanical engineer to become a businessman owning his own corporation and his daughter Mona Zulfikar graduated as a lawyer and became a prominent lawyer owning a law firm. Zulfikar had three grandchildren, Karim Zulfikar is a businessman, Salah Zulfikar is a corporate director and Ingy Badawy is a lawyer.

Besides boxing, Salah Zulfikar was a football fan and used to play football with fellow actors from time to time. He supported Zamalek S.C.

Zulfikar's second marriage was to actress Zahrat El-Ola in 1957, but they were divorced two years later. The love story that brought him together with the singer and actress Shadia was the most famous of all, and they were married while filming in 1964. Together, Zulfikar and Shadia formed an artistic duo through which they presented many successful films in Egyptian Cinema, and Zulfikar produced more than one film with Shadia in the leading role. Their marriage ended in divorce after seven years. Later, he married his last wife, Bahiga, and their marriage continued until his death in 1993.

Filmography 

Prolific in Egyptian film industry for 37 years. Salah Zulfikar was a film producer and film, stage, television, and radio actor. The award-winning actor appeared in feature films, short films, plays, television serials, broadcast serials and paired with all the leading actresses of his generation. As a producer, Zulfikar produced fifteen films and achieved both financial and critical success in the majority of them. He accomplished a history of a total of a two hundred and fifty credits throughout his career leaving an extensive legacy.

References

External links
 

Egyptian male film actors
Egyptian revolutionaries
Egyptian nationalists
Egyptian police officers
1926 births
1993 deaths
Egyptian film producers
Egyptian film actors
Egyptian television actors
20th-century Egyptian male actors
People from El Mahalla El Kubra